Dingeman Jacobus Johannes "Dick" Jaspers (pronounced yas-pers) (born 23 July 1965) is a Dutch professional carom billiards player who specializes in the three-cushion event.

Early life
Jaspers started playing billiards when he was three years old in the pub his parents ran in his home town. Between 1974 and 1980 he participated in the Dutch Youth Championships before making the move to the senior level. In this period he got lessons from Andre Gulickx and Tony Schrauwen

Professional career
Jaspers became a professional billiard player in 1986 after seeing Raymond Ceulemans and Nobuaki Kobayashi on live television during their World Cup final in Valkenburg. Jaspers won two silver medals in the Dutch Championships 1986. In 1987 and 1989 he won the National Championship, and participated three times at the European Youth Championship. He won the gold medal on all of those occasions.

Jaspers started playing in the West German division of the Billiards World Cup Association (BWA) which managed professional GrandPrix tournaments. Jaspers won several of these tournaments and was later suspended by the Confédération Européenne de Billard (CEB) for five years for his participation. Several other worldclass players received the same suspension. The Union Mondiale de Billard supported this decision and Jaspers and the other players were prohibited from participating in European and World Championships for five years. Following the suspension the players remained members of the BWA and played all their tournaments with them, which resulted in a longterm suspension. In 1989 and 1992 Jaspers became European Champion at the European Nation Championships, and in 1991 and 1992 he won the Finals of the Coupe d'Europe events. In 1998 the associations and their players came together to resolve their differences. From then on the players were able to play at the ECs and WCs again. Jaspers won the Three-Cushion World Cup in 1997 and 1999, and received the Golden KNBB Pin in December 1999.

In October 2000, Jaspers dominated the UMB World Three-cushion Championship. Earlier that year he was honored by the BWA. He was not able to defend his title the following year, but he won the silver medal at the 2001 World Games in Akita, Japan.

In Göynük, Turkey, he won the 2003 European Championships and he became UMB World Champion for the second time in 2004 when he overclassed his Greek opponent Filippos Kasidokostas in the final (159, 150, 155). The event was held in Jaspers' home country in Rotterdam. Jaspers would win that event again five years later by defeating Torbjörn Blomdahl.

In 2005, Jaspers won three Silver Medals (World Games, World Nations Championships and Euro Billiards). On 3 September 2006 Jaspers won his 13th Dutch National Championship event.

Jaspers defeated Blomdahl again to win the 2009 AGIPI Billiard Masters. A prize of €20,550 was awarded to him.

Titles
 1997 Three-Cushion World Cup Champion
 1999 Three-Cushion World Cup Champion
 2000 UMB World Three-cushion Champion
 2003 CEB European Three-cushion Champion
 2004 UMB World Three-cushion Champion
 2008 CEB European Three-cushion Champion
 2008 Three-Cushion World Cup Champion
 2009 UMB/CEB AGIPI Masters
 2010 CEB European Three-cushion Champion
 2010 UMB/CEB AGIPI Masters
 2010 Three-Cushion World Cup Champion
 2011 CEB European Three-cushion Champion
 2011 UMB World Three-cushion Champion
 2016 Three-Cushion World Cup Champion

Reference of results

World records
 Threecushion average in a single 1set 40carambole match: 10 (4 innings, 5+11+2+22 = 40 points) (2017)
 Threecushion average in a single 3set 45carambole match: 5.625 (45/8) (2008)
 Most points in a row: 34 over 3 sets (2008, see below)
 Threecushion average in a tournament: 2.536 over 7 matches (2002)  and 2.666 over 4 matches (2005) 

In the 2008 European Championship Final against Torbjorn Blomdahl, Jaspers averaged 5.625.
He ended Game One by going 13 and out in his second innings, ran 15 and out in his first innings of Game Two and ran six in his first innings of Game Three. Thus, he made 34 consecutive points.

References

External links

 Official website

|-

Dutch carom billiards players
Sportspeople from Rucphen
World champions in three-cushion billiards
World Cup champions in three-cushion billiards
1965 births
Living people
World Games silver medalists
World Games gold medalists
Competitors at the 2001 World Games
Competitors at the 2005 World Games
Competitors at the 2009 World Games
Competitors at the 2022 World Games
20th-century Dutch people
21st-century Dutch people